Marié Christina Digby (born April 16, 1983) is an American singer, songwriter, guitarist and pianist known for her acoustic cover version of Rihanna's "Umbrella", which was posted on YouTube in 2007 (and has since been viewed over 22 million times). The song was subsequently played on the radio station STAR 98.7, was featured on the highly rated third season opening episode of the MTV show The Hills, and peaked at #10 on the Bubbling Under Hot 100 Singles chart. Digby performed the song on the late night talk show Last Call with Carson Daly on August 2, 2007. Since then, Digby has released several studio albums, EPs and singles, including one Japanese cover album. Her fifth studio album Winter Fields was released on October 29, 2013.  On August 16, 2014, Marié released Chimera, a 3 track EP.

Life and career

1983–1997: Early life

Digby was born in Los Angeles, California to Matthew Edward Digby (born November 10, 1951 in San Diego, California), who is of Irish descent and Emiko Nishina, who is Japanese. Her two younger sisters are Naomi (born December 12, 1985) and Erina Megan (born August 8, 1987). She began writing songs during high school in Los Angeles, California. After her freshman year at the University of California, Berkeley, she won the 2004 Pantene Pro-Voice competition with her song "Miss Invisible". The grand prize for the concert included working with a professional producer on an album, $5,000 and performing on stage with other top performers.

1997–2008: Career beginnings and Unfold era
After performing at night clubs, Digby signed a publishing deal with Rondor Music, a subsidiary of Vivendi SA's Universal Music Group in early 1998. By the end of 1998, Digby had signed with Disney's Hollywood Records and her first album of original songs was completed by the end of 2005. Also in 2005, her song "Fool" was included on the Disney compilation album Girl Next. In early 2007, she began to post simple videos of herself singing cover songs of other artists on YouTube in order to gain visibility. Hollywood Records then released a studio recording of her rendition of "Umbrella" to iTunes and radio stations. She often performs with a Gibson Hummingbird acoustic guitar.

Digby's first official single, "Say It Again", was released to radio stations on January 18, 2008.  Her debut album, Unfold, which was completed over a year before, was released on April 8, 2008. The design of the cover for the album was mostly based on the sketches she drew during her downtime while recording the album. She worked with some of Hollywood's best including Tom Rothrock (Producer), Charlie Paxson (drums) and Matt Chait (guitar).  Many different editions of the album exist, including a Japanese edition with different cover artwork and an alternate track listing.

2009–2010: Second Home and Breathing Underwater
Digby released a collection of Japanese cover songs on March 4, 2009.  The album, titled Second Home, was recorded completely in Japanese and received a limited release only in Japan.

Digby's second English album titled Breathing Underwater was originally slated for release in May 2009, but she asked the label to push the release date back until she found a new manager. The entire album was leaked in spring 2009. Digby expressed her disappointment with the leaks on her MySpace page. A deluxe edition of the album was released on physical and digital formats across Asia in July 2009. The album was later released in North America in September 2009. When Digby left Hollywood Records, they gave ownership of the master recordings back to her. The album is no longer on digital services.

On December 8, 2010, Digby was featured as one of the many artists to do an urban cover on Disney's Urban Pop Disney CD. Along with DJ Hasebe, Digby sang and put a twist on The Little Mermaid'''s Part of Your World.

2011: Debut in the Philippines
She had a one night only concert in the Philippines on August 1, 2009 at The Tent in Taguig.

In June 2011, she recorded an album for Star Music, ABS-CBN's own record label, in Manila. She promoted the album in the country from August to September 2011. The album includes a cover of Kuh Ledesma's "I Think I'm in Love". It also features Filipino artists Sam Milby and Jericho Rosales. Her first Philippine music video was shot in Nuvali, Laguna. The album Your Love was released on September 16, 2011 by Star Music and MCA Music.

2012: Your Love Asian tour
In 2012, Digby did an Asian tour for her Your Love album, including shows in Singapore and the Philippines.

Her Singapore live show was held on October 18, 2012 at the Esplanade Concert Hall.

In August 2012, she was interviewed by Yahoo!; during the interview, she shared that childhood depression shaped her music career and that she is preparing for her first independent album for 2013.

2013: Winter Fields
Digby introduced a brand new original titled Neon Rain in February 2013, and also released duet singles including "Falling for You", a duet with JayR, and "The Keeper", a duet with Kina Grannis. Her fifth studio album Winter Fields was released on October 29, 2013. She also conducted regular live shows on the Stageit platform on a Pay What You Can ticketing basis.

2015: "Jet Streams"
In December 2015, Digby made a new song titled "Jet Streams" available as a free download on Bandcamp. She also independently released a remake of the holiday classic "Have Yourself A Merry Little Christmas".

2018: Wildfire and Pop Covers
On February 9, 2018, Digby independently released a new EP titled Wildfire which debuted at #4 on the iTunes Singer-Songwriter Albums Chart.

On June 22, 2018, Digby released an album called Pop Covers. It includes ten covers of popular songs and includes Diamonds (Rihanna song) (originally by Rihanna) and Empire (Shakira song) (originally by Shakira) 

YouTube fame
Digby  gained popularity  on YouTube through her simple covers of popular music from various artists, including Linkin Park, Game, Rihanna, Britney Spears, Maroon 5, Incubus, Lady Gaga, Usher, Beyoncé, and Nelly Furtado, as well as her original compositions. She has over 320,000 subscribers and the videos on her channel have amassed over 130 million views, the most popular being a cover of "Umbrella" by Rihanna, which has gained over 20 million views.

Charitable involvement
Digby has ventures encouraging young people to get involved in songwriting and musical performance. In 2009, she sponsored a songwriting contest for Bronx teenagers through "The Generation Project", a non-profit organization that facilitates donor-designed charitable gifts to children in low-income areas.  The winner of Digby's contest—a special education student from the Bronx—received a brand-new guitar with accessories.

Digby held an autographed Fender Stratocaster and Les Paul Guitar Giveaway Contest on YouTube.  Contestants were asked to create an original video that included her hit single "Say It Again" in some fashion. The winner of this contest was Peter Park from Hong Kong.

On April 1, 2011, Digby, together with 29 other musicians participated in Jam For Japan Manila, a benefit concert for victims of the massive March 11 earthquake and tsunami that hit Japan.

In the summer of 2014, Digby visited the Academy of Music for the Blind (AMB), a non-profit organization in Los Angeles dedicated to providing comprehensive music education to talented blind students ages 4–19. She supported the students in their Summer Recital and guest performed with some of the students. She has been an AMB Friend ever since and has donated her talents for their fundraising events and help raise awareness for the blind community via social media. In December 2015, Digby visited and performed with students of the Academy of Music for the Blind (AMB) at their Holiday recital in Whittier, CA.

Discography

 Unfold (2008)
 Second Home (2009)
 Breathing Underwater (2009)
 Your Love (2011)
 Winter Fields (2013)
 Chimera (2014)
 Wildfire EP (2018)
 Pop Covers''  (2018)

Songs in other media

Awards and nominations

References

External links

 Marié Digby's YouTube Channel
 
 

1983 births
Living people
21st-century American women singers
American alternative rock musicians
American child singers
American contemporary R&B singers
American women pop singers
American women rock singers
American women singer-songwriters
American people of Irish descent
American pop rock singers
American women guitarists
American women musicians of Japanese descent
American YouTubers
Guitarists from Los Angeles
Japanese-language singers
Avex Group artists
Hollywood Records artists
University of California, Berkeley alumni
21st-century American singers
Singer-songwriters from California